Herman W. "Porky" Seborg (January 9, 1907 – September 23, 1985) was an American football player. He played college football for Western Michigan and in the National Football League (NFL) as a guard and back for the Minneapolis Red Jackets (1930) and Frankford Yellow Jackets (1930-1931). He appeared in 20 NFL games, 13 as a starter.

References

1907 births
1985 deaths
Western Michigan Broncos football players
Frankford Yellow Jackets players
Minneapolis Red Jackets players
Players of American football from Grand Rapids, Michigan
American football defensive backs
American football guards